Herminia Ibarra  is the Charles Handy Chair in Organisational Behaviour, Professor of Organisational Behaviour and Chair, Organisational Behaviour Faculty at London Business School.

Early life 

Ibarra was born in Cuba and obtained her M.A. and Ph.D. degrees in organisational behaviour from Yale University. She taught for thirteen years at Harvard Business School.

Career 

She was previously Professor of Organizational Behaviour at INSEAD, and before that, Professor of Business Administration at the Harvard Business School. She is a member of the World Economic Forum Global Agenda Councils and is a jury member for the Financial Times and McKinsey & Company Best Business Book of the Year Award. She chaired the Visiting Committee of the Harvard Businesses School and is included in the list of the 50 gurus of the world's most influential businesses. Ibarra is the Charles Handy Professor of Organisational Behaviour at London Business School  and was the Cora Chaired Professor of Leadership and Learning at INSEAD.

In July 2019 Ibarra was elected Fellow of the British Academy.

In 2019, Ibarra broke into the top 40 case authors list published by The Case Centre. She ranked 34th  for the academic year 2018/19.

Publications 
Ibarra is an expert in professional development and executive leadership. She has written articles for Harvard Business Review, Administrative Science Quarterly, Academy of Management Review, Academy of Management Journal and Organization Science. According to Google Scholar, she has more than 22 000 citations and a H-index of 35. She writes for The Wall Street Journal, Financial Times and New York Times. Books:
 
This latest book explores how managers grow into leadership roles and how they can best develop and grow their skills to fit those roles.

References 

Cuban economists
Cuban academics
Academic staff of INSEAD
Cuban women writers
Living people
21st-century women scientists
1970 births
21st-century Cuban women writers
Fellows of the British Academy
Bestselling case authors
Harvard Business School faculty
Academics of London Business School